Robert Rowiński (born 19 May 1984) is a Polish dancer, choreographer and model. Rowiński is a professional dancer on the Polish and Irish versions of Dancing with the Stars.

Early life 
Rowiński is the son of Bożena and Bogdan Rowiński. He has an older sister, Wioleta.

Rowiński completed postgraduate masters studies at the Faculty of Journalism at the University of Warsaw and undertook doctoral sociological studies at Collegium Civitas. He wrote his doctoral thesis on the psychology of emotions in dance.

Dancing with the Stars

Poland (Taniec z gwiazdami)
In Spring 2006, Rowiński made his Taniec z gwiazdami debut dancing with former Miss World, Aneta Kręglicka in the third series of the show. They finished in 7th place.

In Autumn 2006, Rowiński took part in the fourth series of the show. He was paired with actress, Magdalena Wójcik. They finished in 8th place.

In Autumn 2007, Rowiński competed in the sixth series dancing with singer, Halina Mlynkova. Due to an injury sustained in rehearsals, Mlynkova was forced to leave the competition meaning the couple finished in 11th place.

In Spring 2010, Rowiński rejoined the show after three years away pursuing other projects. He was paired with actress and TV presenter, Aleksandra Szwed in the eleventh series. They were eliminated in 9th place.

In Autumn 2010, Rowiński took part in what would be his final season of Taniec z gwiazdami. He was partnered with Olympic pole-vaulter, Monika Pyrek. On 28 November 2010, Pyrek and Rowiński were voted the winners of the twelfth series.

In July 2022, it was announced that Rowiński would return as a professional dance for the twenty-sixth season after a twelve year absence. He will partner, influencer and Farma co-host, Ilona Krawczyńska.

Series 3 

Celebrity partner
 Aneta Kręglicka; Average: 29.0; Place: 7th

Series 4 

Celebrity partner
 Magdalena Wójcik; Average: 30.5; Place: 8th

Series 6 

Celebrity partner
Halina Mlynkova; Average: 35.5; Place: 11th

Series 11 

Celebrity partner
Aleksandra Szwed; Average: 35.4; Place: 9th

Series 12 

Celebrity partner
Monika Pyrek; Average: 37.2; Place: 1st

Series 26 

Celebrity partner
Ilona Krawczyńska; Average: 36,5; Place; 1st

Ireland 
In November 2017, it was announced that Rowiński would be taking part in the 2018 Irish version of Dancing with the Stars. He was partnered with journalist and broadcaster, Maïa Dunphy. They reached the fifth week of the competition, ultimately finishing in 9th place.

In 2019, Rowiński returned for his second series. He was partnered with country music singer, Cliona Hagan. In the seventh week of the competition, the couple became the first pair to receive a perfect score of 30. On 24 March 2019, Rowiński and Hagan reached the final of the competition. They finished as joint runners-up with Johnny Ward and Emily Barker when Mairéad Ronan and John Nolan were named as the winners.

In 2020, Rowiński returned for his third series. He was partnered with Virgin Media One presenter, Glenda Gilson. They were the second couple to be eliminated from the competition.

In 2023, Rowiński returned to the show after a three-year absence when Maurizio Benenato left the series in the third week due to unforeseen circumstances. He was partnered with Eurovision singer, Brooke Scullion. They reached the final, finishing as joint runners-up to Carl Mullan & Emily Barker.

Highest and Lowest Scoring Per Dance

1 This score was awarded during Switch-Up Week.

Series 2 (2018)

 Celebrity partner
 Maïa Dunphy; Average: 16.8; Place: 9th

Series 3 (2019)

 Celebrity partner
Cliona Hagan; Average: 25.5; Place: 2nd

Series 4 (2020)

 Celebrity partner
 Glenda Gilson; Average: 16.7; Place: 10th

Series 6 (2023)

 Celebrity partner
 Brooke Scullion; Average: 26.9; Place: 2nd

1For weeks 1 & 2, Scullion performed her dances with her original partner, Maurizio Benenato.

References 

1984 births
Living people
Polish ballroom dancers
People from Koszalin